Nandini Singh (born 7 August 1980) is an Indian television and film actress, who has worked in both Hindi movies and Hindi serials. Nandini began her career as a child artist in the movie Jumbish in 1986 at the age of six, she worked in  Platform (1993), and Ek Aur Ek Gyarah (2003). She shot to fame as Kesar in Ekta Kapoor's popular hit series Kesar, that aired from 2004 to 2007 on Star Plus and another of Ekta Kapoor's Indian soap operas, Kkavyanjali (2005). She also appeared in a music video, "Dekha Hai Teri Aankhon Ko" by Aryans. The most recent appearance of the actress was in the movie Titoo MBA, released in 2015 as the writer Simran. She has also worked in an episode of Savdhan India.

Television
 Kesar as Kesar Mallya
 Kkavyanjali as Pammi Mittal
 Adaalat (TV Series) - (i) Kissa C.M. Ki Secret List Ka: Part 1 & 2 Episode no. 47/48 (2011) as Meghla Gupta. (ii) Qatil Billi Episode no. 85 (2011) as Kavya. (iii) Vishkanya Part 1 & 2 Episode no. 176/177 (2012) as Sukanya Amrish Goel. (iv) Khwab Mein Hatya: Part 1 & 2 Episode no. 207/208 (2013) as Madhura Shroff.
Begusarai (TV series) - as Shravani   
 Savdhaan India –  Kiran (Episode No 751) /  Kamini (Episode No 891) / Vaishali (Episode No 1290)
 Code Red Talaash (2015) ... Aaliya
 Crime Alert - Belagam Biwi as Sontara (Episode 136) ( 24 January 2019)

Music videos
 "Woh Dheere Dheere Mere Dil Mein" , Album Tere Bina 2003
 "Dekha Hai Teri Aankhon Ko" (Aryans) 2002 
kuch dil ne kaha

Films
 Platform (1993 film) 
 Ek Aur Ek Gyarah 
 Kuch Dil Ne Kaha
 Lo Main Aagayaa 
Titoo MBA as the novel writer Simran
 Baa Nalle Madhuchandrake kannada movie

References

External links
 
 

1980 births
Living people
Actresses from Lucknow
Indian film actresses
Actresses in Hindi cinema
Indian television actresses
Indian soap opera actresses
Actresses in Hindi television
21st-century Indian actresses
Actresses from Mumbai